Limbonic Art is a Norwegian symphonic black metal band from Sandefjord.

History
Limbonic Art was formed in 1993 by Daemon, and was originally a full band featuring 3 other members. Daemon got in touch with Morfeus after the demise of the first line-up. The first recording, a rehearsal demo, was released independently in 1995. The debut album Moon in the Scorpio was released in 1996. The follow-up, 1997's In Abhorrence Dementia, was supported by a tour opening for Emperor, and a year later Limbonic Art issued its third LP, Epitome of Illusions. In 2003, the band decided to split up with a statement from the official site saying "We feel that we have reached as far as we could in our collaboration ... the circle is complete, begin another".

On June 6, 2006, Limbonic Art reunited and started to write new material. On February 21, 2007 it was announced that the band plans to release the new album entitled Legacy of Evil in the summer.

A subsequent dispute between the band members resulted in Morfeus being ousted from the band, making Limbonic Art essentially Daemon's solo project. He has currently completed the new Limbonic Art release, named Phantasmagoria, out summer 2010.

Discography

Studio albums
 Moon in the Scorpio (1996)
 In Abhorrence Dementia (1997)
 Epitome of Illusions (1998)
 Ad Noctum - Dynasty of Death (1999)
 The Ultimate Death Worship (2002)
 Legacy of Evil (2007)
 Phantasmagoria (2010)
 Spectre Abysm (2017)

Demo albums
 Promo Rehearsal '95 (1995)
 Promo 1996 (1996)

Compilation albums
 Chronicles of Limbo (2000)
 Volume I-IV (2001)
 1995-1996 (2009)
 1996 (2010)

Line-up

Current members
 Vidar "Daemon" Jensen - vocals, guitars, bass, keyboards, drum programming, electronics - (1993–2003, 2006–present)

Country:Norway

From: Sandefjord.

Marital status: married .

Spouse:Veronika Jensen-Startseva.

Past members
 Krister "Morfeus" Dreyer - lead guitar, vocals (on early albums), keyboards, drum programming,  electronics, samples (1993–2003, 2006–2010)
 Erlend Hole - bass (1993)
 Roger Jacobsen - drums (1993)
 Roy A. Sørlie - guitars (1993)
 Per Eriksen - drums (1995-1996)

References

 Limbonic Art on Encyclopaedia Metallum

External links
 Official MySpace
 Discogs
 AllMusic

Musical groups established in 1993
Norwegian symphonic black metal musical groups
Norwegian black metal musical groups
Norwegian musical duos
Musical groups from Sandefjord
Candlelight Records artists